Sir Thomas Proby, 1st Baronet (18 October 1632 – 22 April 1689) of Elton Hall, Huntingdonshire (now Cambridgeshire) was an English politician who sat in the House of Commons between 1660 and 1685.

Proby was the son of Sir Heneage Proby (of Elton and Raans, Buckinghamshire) and his wife Ellen Allen, daughter of Edward Allen, of Finchley, Middlesex.

In 1660, Proby was elected Member of Parliament for Amersham in the Convention Parliament. He was re-elected MP for Amersham in the Cavalier Parliament and sat until 1679.  He was created a baronet in 1662. In 1679 he was elected MP for  Huntingdonshire and sat until 1685.

He carried out a number of improvements to Elton Hall. Proby died at the age of  56.

Family
Proby married  Frances Cotton, daughter of Sir Thomas Cotton, 2nd Baronet of Connington, Huntingdonshire. His daughter Alice married the Hon. Thomas Watson-Wentworth MP, and had an only child, Thomas Watson-Wentworth, 1st Marquess of Rockingham. Proby's son died travelling and the baronetcy became extinct on Proby's death. The Elton estate passed to his brother John Proby.

References

1632 births
1689 deaths
People from Amersham
People from Elton, Cambridgeshire
English MPs 1660
English MPs 1661–1679
English MPs 1680–1681
English MPs 1681
Baronets in the Baronetage of England
Members of the Parliament of England (pre-1707) for constituencies in Huntingdonshire